Shui Chuen O, also known as Sugar Loaf Peak, is a  tall mountain located in Sha Tin, in Hong Kong's New Territories.

Residential area 
The Shui Chuen O area is located between Lion Rock Country Park and Ma On Shan Country Park. Currently, this area primarily consists of public housing estates. The use of Country Park periphery sites at Shui Chuen O for housing has been controversial and conservationists have warned that such development could "spread like a virus".

See also 
 List of mountains, peaks and hills in Hong Kong
 Shui Chuen O Estate
 Sha Tin
 Fo Tan

References 

Sha Tin District